Saint-Janvier-de-Joly is a municipality in the Municipalité régionale de comté de Lotbinière in Quebec, Canada. It is part of the Chaudière-Appalaches region and the population is 1,079 as of 2021. It is named after reverend Janvier Lachance, missionary who will serve the parish from 1914 to 1926. "Joly" honours Quebec premier Henri-Gustave Joly de Lotbinière and owner of the seigneurie of Lotbinière, in which part of Saint-Janvier-de-Joly's territory lay.

The post office, opened in 1924, is called Joly, name under which the municipality is most commonly known.

References

Commission de toponymie du Québec
Ministère des Affaires municipales, des Régions et de l'Occupation du territoire

Municipalities in Quebec
Incorporated places in Chaudière-Appalaches
Lotbinière Regional County Municipality